1996 Haridwar and Ujjain stampedes refer to two crowd crushes which occurred on 15 July 1996, in holy Indian towns of Haridwar and Ujjain, killing 21 and 39, and injuring 40 and 35 hindu worshippers at respective places.

See also
 Crowd collapses and crushes

References 

1996 disasters in India
History of Uttarakhand (1947–present)
Disasters in Uttarakhand
History of Madhya Pradesh (1947–present)
Religion in Uttarakhand
Religion in Madhya Pradesh

History of Haridwar
History of Ujjain
Disasters in Madhya Pradesh